La Gaillarde is a commune situated in the Seine-Maritime department in the Normandy region in northern France.

Geography

Population

Places of interest
 Two 16th-century stone crosses.
 A recently restored 11th-century chapel.
 The church of Notre-Dame, dating from the twelfth century.

See also
Communes of the Seine-Maritime department

References

Communes of Seine-Maritime